Fung Ting Court is a Home Ownership Scheme court developed by the Hong Kong Housing Authority in Yuen Long Town, New Territories, Hong Kong near Fung Kam Street Sports Centre. Formerly the site of Yuen Long Factory Estate, the factory estate was built by the Resettlement Department in 1966, in order to relocate squatter factories and cottage workshops. In 1973, the management of the estate was taken over by the Hong Kong Housing Authority. In 1997, the clearance of the estate was completed. In 2001, two small blocks were built in the site.

Houses

Politics
Fung Ting Court is located in Fung Cheung constituency of the Yuen Long District Council. It was formerly represented by Johnny Mak Ip-sing, who was elected in the 2019 elections until July 2021.

See also

Public housing estates in Yuen Long

References

Home Ownership Scheme
Residential buildings completed in 2001
Yuen Long Town